Yu Chao-wei (born 22 October 1993) is a Taiwanese male artistic gymnast.

Career 
Yu represented Chinese Taipei at the 2017 Summer Universiade and helped the team finish fifth. He qualified for the rings final and finished eighth. He also represented Chinese Taipei at the 2018 Asian Games where the team finished fourth. Individually, Yu competed in the all-around and finished thirteenth.

Yu was a member of the team that qualified for the 2020 Olympic Games at the 2019 World Championships. In the team final, the Chinese Taipei team finished sixth.

Yu was initially selected to represent Chinese Taipei at the 2020 Summer Olympics. However, he tore his ACL during training in July, and he was replaced by Hung Yuan-hsi.

References

External links 
 

1993 births
Living people
Taiwanese male artistic gymnasts
Gymnasts at the 2018 Asian Games
Asian Games competitors for Chinese Taipei
Competitors at the 2017 Summer Universiade
Place of birth missing (living people)
21st-century Taiwanese people